Ronald William Tilsed (born 6 August 1952) is an English former footballer and manager.

Playing career

Club career
Tilsed began his career with Bournemouth & Boscombe as an apprentice, making two appearances before moving to Chesterfield in 1972. After 16 appearances, Tilsed was signed by Arsenal. After six months and no first team appearances, Tilsed transferred to Portsmouth. He played 14 times for Portsmouth before transferring to Hereford United where he only played a handful of pre-season matches before moving on. He spent time at South African club Rangers before emigrating to Australia.

Tilsed was Canberra City's first ever signing and made his debut on their first game in the National Soccer League (NSL) on 4 April 1977. In 1984, Tilsed played 13 matches in the NSL for Wollongong City.

International career
Tilsed was a member of the England national under-18 football team that won the 1971 UEFA European Under-18 Championship.

References

Living people
1952 births
English footballers
AFC Bournemouth players
Chesterfield F.C. players
Arsenal F.C. players
Hereford United F.C. players
Rangers F.C. (South Africa) players
Canberra City FC players
Wollongong Wolves FC players
Expatriate soccer players in South Africa
English expatriates in South Africa
English expatriate footballers
English emigrants to Australia
Association football goalkeepers